Soviet submarine K-21 is a K-class submarine of the Soviet Navy during World War II.

Construction 
The boat was laid on 10 December 1937 in Leningrad and launched on 16 August 1939. On 3 February 1941, it was commissioned as part of the Baltic Fleet under the command of Nikolai Lunin. On 17 September 1941, it was reenlisted in the Northern Fleet.

Service history 
On its first war patrol, K-21 laid 11 mines in the Strait of Best-Sung. On the morning of 27 November 1941, one of the mines struck and sank the Norwegian transport Bessheim. Between 9 November 1941 and 31 March 1942, K-21 unsuccessfully engaged three merchant ships and one German auxiliary patrol vessel. On 21 January 1942, Norwegian fishing boat F-223N Ingøy was sunk by gunfire from K-21.

Attack on Tirpitz 
On 5 July 1942, K-21 was in the vicinity of the Island of Ingay when she spotted the German battleship Tirpitz which was en route to intercept Convoy PQ 17 which was traveling from Iceland to Murmansk. However this mission was unsuccessful as the Tirpitz turned away. The convoy itself scattered upon hearing words of Tirpitz'''s imminent arrival, and most of the convoy's merchant ships were picked off by U-boats and the Luftwaffe.

On 27 June 1942, the K-21 received an order to take up a combat position to cover Convoy PQ-17. Later, the submarine received a radiogram telling that a German squadron consisting of the battleship Tirpitz, the heavy cruiser Admiral Scheer, and several destroyers were moving to intercept the PQ-17 convoy. K-21 began to search for the enemy squadron. On 5 July, at 4:33 pm, noise of approaching propellers was heard. The squadron was maneuvering in a zigzag pattern. The first ships to be seen were destroyers of the 1936 class, and they covered Tirpitz and the cruiser Admiral Scheer from possible attacks from submarines. The commander of K-21 decided to attack. K-21 bypassed the destroyers' protective barrier and went inside the squadron. Having approached to a distance of almost 13,000 feet the submarine fired a four torpedo spread from stern torpedo tubes towards the Tirpitz. Acoustics and crew members in the compartments of the submarine heard two explosions however, after the war, historians in German documents did not find evidence of torpedoes making contact with the battleship; the Germans did not even take notice of the attack. Historian M.E. Morozov put forward a hypothesis about the impossibility of torpedoes hitting the battleship, and he explained the origin of the explosions saying that the torpedoes detonated early. There are no references to Lunin's attack in the Tirpitz documents of the event.K-21 sank four small Norwegian motor boats via gunfire on 12 February 1943 at Lopphavet. On 22 April 1943, the German merchant ship Duna was sunk by a mine laid by K-21 on 18 February 1943. In May 1945, the boat was repaired.

 Postwar 
October 1948, K-21'' made the first Soviet submarine voyage off the coast of the United States.
From 6 to 14 April 1949 the boat took part in oceanographic work in the area of the Novaya Zemlya archipelago.

After withdrawal from service, for about 20 years she served as a training ship.

In the spring of 1981, she was moved to the city of Polyarny, Murmansk Oblast to be converted into a museum ship. After reworking three compartments for the exposition (the other 4 remained virtually unchanged) was put on a pedestal (immersed in water at high tide) as a museum in Severomorsk, Russia. The museum was opened in 1983. In the late 1990s, the boat underwent some general repairs. From 2008 to 2009, the museum was renovated.

Awards and achievements 
On 23 October 1942, the K-21 submarine was awarded the Order of the Red Banner.

Summary of raiding history 

On 14 September 1943 other three small Norwegian fishing boats (Havatta, Baren and Eyshteyn) were attacked with gunfire but escaped despite damage.

References

Further reading 

Сергеев Константин Михайлович. Лунин атакует "Тирпиц"! — СПб.: ГУП СПМБМ "Малахит", 1999. — 232 с. — (Вестник "Подводное кораблестроение. Прошлое, настоящее, будущее". Выпуск No. 13). — 800 экз.
Ivo Pejčoch, Zdeněk Novák, Tomáš Hájek. Válečné lodě 4. Naše vojsko (1993). .
2008-12-29, Музей Северного флота обновит свою экспозицию, Росбалт
ПЛ ТИПА "К" (КРЕЙСЕРСКАЯ) серии XIV
2008-06-27, Тайна атаки К-21, Еженедельник

Ships built in the Soviet Union
Ships built in Saint Petersburg
Soviet K-class submarines
World War II submarines of the Soviet Union
Museum ships in Russia